The Washington & Jefferson Presidents football team represents Washington & Jefferson College in collegiate level football.  The team competes in the NCAA Division III and is affiliated with the Presidents' Athletic Conference (PAC).  Since its founding in 1890, the team has played their home games at Cameron Stadium.

The team was quite successful in its early years, ending each of its first 20 seasons with a winning record.  David C. Morrow served as head coach three times for a total of eight seasons across three different decades.  The team went on hiatus for two seasons during World War II.  In 1970, the Presidents won their first Presidents' Athletic Conference championship.  John Luckhardt coached for 17 seasons.  Under his leadership, the team began a 26-year streak of winning seasons, running from 1984 to 2009.

Season records

References

General

Specific

Washington and Jefferson Presidents
Washington & Jefferson Presidents football seasons